Edith Schlüssel was a Danish film editor active from 1934 to 1972. She often worked with director Carl Theodor Dreyer.

Selected filmography 

 Bedroom Mazurka (1970)
 [[Sytten|Eric Soya's '17''']] (1965)
 Gertrud (1964)
 Tre må man være (1959)
 The Man Who Couldn't Say No (1958)
 Soldaterkammerater (1958)
 Sønnen fra Amerika (1957)
 Ordet (1955)
 Det gælder livet (1953)
 Min søn Peter (1953)
 Hejrenæs (1953)
 Dorte (1951)
 I gabestokken (1950)
 Det gælder os alle (1949)
 Lucky Journey (1947)
 My Name Is Petersen (1947)
 Letter from the Dead (1946)
 The Invisible Army (1945)
 Mens sagføreren sover (1945)
 Otte akkorder (1944)
 Day of Wrath (1943)
 Peter Andersen (1941)
 Panserbasse (1936)
 Snushanerne (1936)
 Week-end (1935)
 Kidnapped (1935)
 Ud i den kolde sne'' (1934)

References 

Women film editors
Danish film editors
1899 births
1981 deaths